The Actors of China Awards are television awards presented annually by the China Television Artists Association. The awards recognize excellent actors and actresses in the Chinese television industry.

History 
The Actors of China Award was originally named "Image List of Chinese Television Actors" in 2014. It was renamed to "The Actors of China" in 2015. In 2016, the committee awards were added. The award ceremonies were hosted in Yangzhou in the first 4 years. In 2018, Chengdu acquired the right to host award ceremonies for the next 6 years.

Award categories

Ballot awards
The ballot awards are divided into four main sections:
 The Ruby Award, also known as The Best Actor/Actress of the Year Award in the Red Group, is awarded to actors/actresses over 55 years old.
 The Sapphire Award, also known as The Best Actor/Actress of the Year Award in the Blue Group, is awarded to actors/actresses aged between 36 and 54
 The Emerald Award, also known as The Best Actor/Actress of the Year Award in the Green Group, is awarded to actors/actresses aged between 18 and 35.
 The Web Series Award, also known as The Best Actor/Actress of the Year Award in the Web Series Group, is awarded to actors/actresses cast in the web series and aged between 18 and 40.
The steps for deciding the ballot awards are as follows:
 Step 1: A recommendation group consisting of performing artists, directors, producers, and screenwriters recommends candidate actors. After summarizing and reviewing, a list of candidates is determined and announced online.
 Step 2: The audience vote online. The top 6 with the highest votes for each category, a total of 48 people (4 sections, each section consisting of actor/actress categories) , entered the finalist. In addition, these 48 people are all awarded with The Excellent Actor in the Actors of China.
 Step 3: The committee select the final winners among 48 people through a non-anonymous ballot. The final winners will accept their awards in the ceremony.

Committee awards
In addition, the committee also decide other awards without ballot. The categories of committee awards vary in different years, including:
 The Committee Actor Award, also known as The Expert Award in the 3rd ceremony, recognizes senior artists.
 The Best Character Actor Award, recognizes actors who have never played any lead role in their long-term acting career, but have played classic "small roles".
 The Lifetime Achievement Actor Award, also known as The Artistic Achievement Actor Award in the 7th ceremony.

Ceremony

Award recipients 

Note: The Excellent Actor in the Actors of China is awarded to all 48 candidates completing the step-2 ballot, thus are not listed in the table. If a person entered the 48-candidate list but failed to win the final award, the award section of his/her wiki page can be recorded in either way: 1. Excellent Actor/Actress (won) or 2. Best Actor/Actress (nom)

References 

Chinese television awards
Awards established in 2014